Jagdgeschwader 132 (JG 132) was a fighter wing of Nazi Germany's Luftwaffe before World War II. Formed in 1934 under the cover of Reklamestaffel Mitteldeutschland des DLV. In 1938, the wing was renamed Jagdgeschwader 131 and in May 1939 became Jagdgeschwader 2 "Richthofen". The second formation of JG 132 in November 1938 was initiated by renaming Jagdgeschwader 234 to JG 132 which then became Jagdgeschwader 26 "Schlageter" in May 1939. I. Gruppe of JG 132 was given the honorary name "Richthofen", named after Manfred von Richthofen, in March 1935. With the reformation of JG 132 in November 1938, the Geschwader carried the honorary name "Schlageter", named after Albert Leo Schlageter.

History
JG 132 was the oldest fighter unit of the Luftwaffe, its roots dating back to 1934. The first element of JG 132 formed was I. Gruppe (1st group) under the cover name Reklamestaffel Mitteldeutschland des DLV (Advertisement Squadron Middle Germany of the German Air Sports Association) on 1 May 1934 in Döberitz. The Gruppe was placed under the command of Major Robert Ritter von Greim. On 1 April 1935, II. Gruppe of JG 132 was created at Jüterbog Airfield and placed under the command of Hauptmann Johann Raithel. The Geschwaderstab (headquarters unit) of JG 132 was established on 1 April 1936, making it the first Geschwaderstab of the Luftwaffe. Now a Major, Raithel was appointed JG 132s first Geschwaderkommodore (wing commander). Command of II. Gruppe was then handed to Major Carl-August von Schoenebeck. On 1 July 1938, III. Gruppe of JG 132 under the command of Major Ernst Bormann was formed at Jüterbog Airfield. Tenure of the Gruppe with JG 132 ended on 1 November 1938 when the unit was detached and became the II. Gruppe of Zerstörergeschwader 141 (ZG 141—141st Destroyer Wing). IV. Gruppe of JG 132 was also formed on 1 July 1938 and headed by Oberstleutnant Theo Osterkamp. The Gruppe left JG 132 on 3 November to form the nucleus of a new Jagdgeschwader, becoming the I. Gruppe of Jagdgeschwader 331 (JG 331—331st Fighter Wing) which later became the I. Gruppe of Jagdgeschwader 77 (JG 77—77th Fighter Wing). On 1 November 1938, JG 132 was renamed and became Jagdgeschwader 131 (JG 131—131st Fighter Wing).

On 1 November 1938, the same day JG 132 was renamed to JG 131, Jagdgeschwader 234 "Schlageter" (JG 234—234th Fighter Wing), under the command of Oberst Eduard Ritter von Schleich, was also renamed and became the second instance of JG 132. On 1 May 1939, JG 132 was again renamed and became Jagdgeschwader 26 "Schlager".

Commanding officers

Wing commanders

On 1 November 1938, JG 132 was renamed and became the newly formed JG 131 while on the same day elements of JG 234 became the second instance of JG 132.

Group commanders

I. Gruppe of JG 132

On 1 November 1938, I. Gruppe of JG 132 was renamed and became the newly formed I. Gruppe of JG 131 while on the same day I. Gruppe of JG 234 became the second instance of I. Gruppe of JG 132.

II. Gruppe of JG 132

On 1 November 1938, II. Gruppe of JG 132 became the I. Gruppe of ZG 141 while on the same day II. Gruppe of JG 234 became the second instance of II. Gruppe of JG 132.

III. Gruppe of JG 132
On 1 November 1938, III. Gruppe of JG 132 became the II. Gruppe of ZG 141.

IV. Gruppe of JG 132
On 3 November 1938, IV. Gruppe of JG 132 became the I. Gruppe of JG 331.

References

Citations

Bibliography

 
 

Fighter wings of the Luftwaffe 1933-1945
Military units and formations established in 1934
Military units and formations disestablished in 1939